"Hundido En Un Rincón" (English: Depressed in a corner) is the second radio single and the third track from Maná's fourth studio album, Cuando los Ángeles Lloran in 1995. On the week of October 7, 1995 the song debuted at number twenty-five on the U.S. Billboard Hot Latin Tracks and after two weeks later on October 21, 1995 it reach to its highest point at the number twelve spot for only one week. It would stayed for a total of 6 weeks.

Charts

References

1995 singles
Maná songs
Spanish-language songs
Songs written by Fher Olvera
Warner Music Latina singles
1995 songs